Dirk Sager (13 August 1940 – 2 January 2014) was a German journalist.

Life 
Sager studied American studies, politics and journalism at the Free University of Berlin. He worked as journalist in German television. Since 1968 he worked for German broadcaster ZDF. He was member of P.E.N.

Awards 
 1997: Deutscher Kritikerpreis (together with Friedhelm Brebeck and Friedrich Schreiber)
 2002: Hanns Joachim Friedrichs Award

References

External links 
 
 
 Dirk Sager - ZDF trauert um Reporter Dirk Sager 

Journalists from Hamburg
German male journalists
20th-century German journalists
21st-century German journalists
1940 births
2014 deaths
German male writers
Rundfunk im amerikanischen Sektor people
ZDF people